SS Catalonia was a cargo passenger vessel built in 1881 and owned by the Cunard Line.

History 
SS Catalonia was launched on 14 May 1881 and began her maiden voyage on 6 August, sailing from Liverpool to Queenstown to New York City. Until 1899, the ship operated between Liverpool and Boston, with the exception of two other trips to New York (besides the maiden voyage). The ship measured 429.6 feet by 43 feet with 4,481 gross tonnage and could carry 200 first-class passengers and 1,500 third-class passengers.

Wreck 
On 7 May 1888 the steamer struck a rock and was damaged at Mizen Head, off the coast of Ireland. She suffered damage to her stern and underwent repairs for eight days following the incident.

On 20 October 1897 Catalonia rescued the crew of the fishing vessel Vague which was sinking off the Grand Banks of Newfoundland.

Service during the Second Boer War 
The ship was requisitioned for use in the Second Boer War from 1899 to 1900, and was captained by both James Clayton Barr and William Thomas Turner during the course of the war. She may have been used as a floating prison for Boers during the war. The vessel arrived at Genoa for scrapping on 24 May 1901.

References

Ships built on the River Clyde
1881 ships
Passenger ships of the United Kingdom
Ships of the Cunard Line
Maritime incidents in May 1888
Ships built in Glasgow